The 2012 season was York Region Shooters's 15th season in the Canadian Soccer League. The season witnessed York Region finish in the top five in the First Division since the 2010 season with the fourth highest defensive record. The club qualified for the playoffs for the 10th consecutive season, and defeated the Windsor Stars in the opening round. Their postseason journey came to a conclusion in the second round after a defeat to the Montreal Impact Academy, while their reserve team shared a similar fate in the Second Division playoffs after a loss to Brampton City United B. The top goalscorers for the season were Jason De Thomasis, Aundrae Rollins, and for the record seventh consecutive time Kadian Lecky each with four goals.

Summary  
The club began preparations for the 2012 season by making an agreement with PEAC School for Elite Athletes for the access of their facilities and expertise of qualified instructors. The managerial structure changed with Tony De Thomasis returning to the helm as head coach. York's schedule saw them kick off their season at home on  May 6, with the Shooters winning 1–0 thanks to a goal from Aundrae Rollins. Following their victory at home the club achieved a four game undefeated streak. After receiving their first defeat of the season on June 1 against the Serbian White Eagles the club recovered with a fourteen game undefeated streak with only two defeats recorded throughout the season.

The organization managed a fifth place standing in the First Division as a result secured a postseason berth. In the preliminary round of the playoffs the Shooters defeated the Windsor Stars, but were eliminated in the following round by the Montreal Impact Academy. Meanwhile in the Second Division their reserve team clinched their fifth consecutive playoff berth after finishing seventh in the standings. The team reached the semifinals, but were defeated by Brampton City United B by a score of 2–0.

Club

Management

Squad
As of October 7, 2012.

Transfers

In

Out

Competitions summary

Regular season

First division

Results summary

Results by round

Matches

Postseason

Statistics

Goals 
Correct as of October 7, 2012

References

York Region Shooters
York Region Shooters
2012